William of Brunswick-Grubenhagen ( – 1360) was a Prince of Brunswick-Grubenhagen.

Life 
He was the third son of Duke Henry I "Mirabilis" of Brunswick-Grubenhagen and his wife Agnes, née Countess of Meissen.  After his father's death in 1322, he ruled Grubenhagen jointly with his brothers, Henry II and Ernest I.

William died childless in 1360.  After his death, his brother Ernest ruled the principality of Grubenhagen alone.

References and sources 
 Paul Zimmermann: Das Haus Braunschweig-Grubenhagen, Wolfenbüttel, 1911

Princes of Grubenhagen
1360 deaths
Year of birth uncertain
Old House of Brunswick